Thesaban nakhon Trang ( (translated as Trang city municipality)), City of Trang, or Trang, also called Mueang Thap Thiang, is a thesaban nakhon (city municipality) and the capital of Trang Province, Thailand. The city has a population of 59,637 (2005) and covers the whole tambon Thap Thiang of Mueang Trang district. Trang is 839 km south of Bangkok.

Geography
Trang lies on the Trang River, roughly halfway between the Tenasserim Hills and the coast of the Andaman Sea.

Climate
Trang has a tropical monsoon climate (Köppen climate classification Am). At just 8°N, the temperature in Trang is sees little variation throughout the year, although the pre-monsoon months from February to April are a little hotter in the daytime. The year is divided into a short dry season, from January to February, and a long wet season from March to December, with the heaviest rain in September. There is still some rain, however, in the dry season.

Transportation
The main road through Trang is Phetkasem Road (Route 4), which connects the city to Phatthalung and the border with Malaysia to the south-east, and to Krabi, Phang Nga, Phuket (via Route 402), Ranong, Chumphon, Prachuap Khiri Khan, Phetchaburi, Ratchaburi, and Bangkok to the north.

Trang is on a branch (terminating at Kantang of the Southern Line of the State Railway of Thailand.

Trang is served by Trang Airport, seven km from the city.  Thai AirAsia, Nok Air and Thai Lion Air provide services to Bangkok from Trang.

References

External links

Populated places in Trang province
Cities and towns in Thailand